Blue Dog Lake is a lake in South Dakota, in the United States.

Blue Dog Lake has the name of an Indian chief who settled there.

See also
List of lakes in South Dakota

References

Lakes of South Dakota
Lakes of Day County, South Dakota